is the main Keihan Electric Railway station in Kyoto.  It connects with Sanjo Keihan Station on the Kyoto Subway Tozai Line.  It was opened for service on October 27, 1915, and has been in service ever since. Sanjo Station is located in the Higashiyama Ward, in Kyoto City. The station offers quick access to the Gion district and the main shopping district on Sanjo-dori.

Lines
Keihan Electric Railway
Keihan Main Line
Ōtō Line
Kyoto Municipal Subway
Tōzai Line (Sanjō Keihan Station)

The station was also a terminal of the Keishin Line, which was replaced by the Tōzai Line subway in 1997.

Layout
There are two island platforms with four tracks under Kawabata Dori.

Adjacent stations

Station Area
 Sanjō Ōhashi
 Ponto-chō
 Ikedaya incident

References

External links
 Station map by Keihan Railway

Railway stations in Japan opened in 1915
Railway stations in Kyoto